David Pinkerton (26 September 1836 – 23 June 1906) was a New Zealand Member of Parliament for Dunedin City, in the South Island.

Early life
Born in Kirknewton, West Lothian, Scotland. He married Margaret Fairley on 1 December 1857 with whom he had three daughters. Pinkerton came to New Zealand in 1861.

Political career

Pinkerton headed the poll for City of Dunedin in 1890 and 1893. He played a prominent role in Dunedin trade unionism in the late 1880s, was active in the anti-sweating movement, and served as President of the Otago Trades and Labour Council.

Pinkerton was appointed to the Legislative Council after his 1896 defeat, serving from 1897 to 1906, when he died. He was buried at the Dunedin Southern Cemetery.

Notes

References

1836 births
1906 deaths
New Zealand Liberal Party MPs
Members of the New Zealand Legislative Council
New Zealand trade unionists
Scottish emigrants to New Zealand
New Zealand MPs for Dunedin electorates
Burials at Dunedin Southern Cemetery
Unsuccessful candidates in the 1896 New Zealand general election
People from West Lothian
Members of the New Zealand House of Representatives
19th-century New Zealand politicians